Nikolina Knežević, née Babić, (16 February 1995) is a  tall Bosnian basketball player, playing as point guard. She plays for BK Žabiny Brno. She is a member of the women's basketball team of Bosnia and Herzegovina.

Career 
She spent the first three years of her career in ŽKK Željezničar Sarajevo from Sarajevo, and where she won her first professional title. After that she continued her career abroad, playing first for Montenegrin first tier club ŽKK Budućnost Bemax, then, she moved to Ukraine where she played for BC Prometey, and then to the Turkish Women's Basketball Super League where she played for İzmit Belediyespor. Recently, she moved to the Czech Women's Basketball League, where she signed for BK Žabiny Brno, the club which holds record fourteen Czech championship titles.

Honours 
Nikolina won title with ŽKK Željezničar Sarajevo.

Personal life
Nikolina Babić recently married and took her husband's surname Knežević.

References 

Bosnia and Herzegovina women's basketball players
People from Sarajevo
1995 births
Living people